Baldwin is a city in Jackson County, Iowa, United States. The population was 99 at the 2020 census.

History
Baldwin was originally called Fremont. The present name is for Edward Baldwin, the original owner of the town site.

In 1910, Baldwin contained several general stores, a drug store, harness shop, meat market, hotel, saloon, restaurant, livery barn, and a barber shop.

Geography
Baldwin is located at  (42.073847, -90.840617).

Demographics

2010 census
As of the census of 2010, there were 109 people, 54 households, and 30 families living in the city. The racial makeup of the city was 100.0% White.

There were 54 households, of which 24.1% had children under the age of 18 living with them, 40.7% were married couples living together, 13.0% had a female householder with no husband present, 1.9% had a male householder with no wife present, and 44.4% were non-families. 38.9% of all households were made up of individuals, and 11.1% had someone living alone who was 65 years of age or older. The average household size was 2.02 and the average family size was 2.70.

The median age in the city was 43.8 years. 17.4% of residents were under the age of 18; 7.4% were between the ages of 18 and 24; 26.6% were from 25 to 44; 30.3% were from 45 to 64; and 18.3% were 65 years of age or older. The gender makeup of the city was 47.7% male and 52.3% female.

2000 census
As of the census of 2000, there were 127 people, 57 households, and 33 families living in the city. The population density was 355.0 people per square mile (136.2 per km2). There were 57 housing units at an average density of 159.3 per square mile (61.1 per km2). The racial makeup of the city was 99.21% White, and 0.79% from two or more races.

There were 57 households, out of which 28.1% had children under the age of 18 living with them, 40.4% were married couples living together, 12.3% had a female householder with no husband present, and 42.1% were non-families. 36.8% of all households were made up of individuals, and 15.8% had someone living alone who was 65 years of age or older. The average household size was 2.23 and the average family size was 2.91.

In the city, the population was spread out, with 23.6% under the age of 18, 7.1% from 18 to 24, 32.3% from 25 to 44, 19.7% from 45 to 64, and 17.3% who were 65 years of age or older. The median age was 40 years. For every 100 females, there were 98.4 males. For every 100 females age 18 and over, there were 106.4 males.

The median income for a household in the city was $35,313, and the median income for a family was $43,438. Males had a median income of $32,500 versus $21,563 for females. The per capita income for the city was $15,997. There were no families and 2.3% of the population living below the poverty line, including no under eighteens and 7.1% of those over 64.

Government
Baldwin has a mayor-council government; as of January 2017 the mayor is Jerry Neace, and the members of the city council are Dustin Mealor, Theron Ayers, Joe Elam, Jeff Parrish, and Larry Lewallen.

Education 
The Maquoketa Community School District operates the public school system.

References

Cities in Iowa
Cities in Jackson County, Iowa